Augustusburg is a town in the district of Mittelsachsen, in Saxony, Germany. It is situated 12 km east of Chemnitz. Augustusburg is known for its Jagdschloss, the hunting lodge of the same name.

The town includes the ortsteil or town quarters of:

 Augustusburg
 Erdmannsdorf
 Grünberg
 Hennersdorf
 Kunnersdorf

A funicular railway, the Augustusburg Cable Railway, connects Erdmannsdorf-Augustusburg station, in the village of Erdmannsdorf and on the Zschopau Valley Railway, with the town.

Geography

Location
Augustusburg is located in the Ore Mountains (Erzgebirge), approx. 15 km east of Chemnitz, 5 km south east of Flöha, 20 km south west of Freiberg and 9 km north of Zschopau in the district of Mittelsachsen.

Situation
Augustusburg is situated on a ridge between the valleys Zschopau and the Flöha rivers. The town is primarily surrounded by forests. The highest point is the Schellenberg, at 516 m on which the castle is found. The lowest point is the Zschopautal at about 300 m.

History

Historical Population 
The following population figures correspond to the population as of 31 December of each year within the municipality borders of January 2007:

 Source: Official Statistical Office of the Free State of Saxony

References 

 
Mittelsachsen